Alejandro Ortiz (born 3 May 1952) is a Cuban former basketball player who competed in the 1976 Summer Olympics and in the 1980 Summer Olympics.

References

1952 births
Living people
Cuban men's basketball players
1974 FIBA World Championship players
Olympic basketball players of Cuba
Basketball players at the 1976 Summer Olympics
Basketball players at the 1980 Summer Olympics
Basketball players at the 1971 Pan American Games
Pan American Games bronze medalists for Cuba
Pan American Games medalists in basketball
Medalists at the 1971 Pan American Games